Every Day is the second studio album by the Cinematic Orchestra. It was released through Ninja Tune on 27 April 2002 in Japan and 13 May 2002 elsewhere. It was re-released in November 2003 with two additional tracks. It was written and produced by band members Phil France and Jason Swinscoe. In 2010, it was awarded a gold certification from the Independent Music Companies Association, which indicated sales of at least 100,000 copies throughout Europe.

Track listing 
 "All That You Give" (feat. Fontella Bass) – 6:10
 "Burn Out" – 10:13
 "Flite" – 6:35
 "Evolution" (feat. Fontella Bass) – 6:38
 "Man with the Movie Camera" – 9:09
 "All Things to All Men" (feat. Roots Manuva) – 11:04
 "Everyday" – 10:18
Additional tracks on re-release:
"Oregon" – 3:54
"Horizon" (feat. Niara Scarlett) – 4:44

Samples and inspiration 
 The album's longest track, "All Things to All Men", samples John Barry's original soundtrack to the 1968 film Petulia.
 The track "Man with the Movie Camera" bears strong thematic similarities to music composed by Bernard Herrmann for the film The 7th Voyage of Sinbad (1958), in particular, a scene in which Sinbad arrives in Baghdad.

Alternate releases 
 In Japan, the album was released on Beat Records a couple of weeks earlier than the  original UK album. It contained nine tracks: the seven from the original release plus "Oregon" and a track called "Semblance".

Release history

References

External links 
 
 

2002 albums
The Cinematic Orchestra albums
Ninja Tune albums